This title may refer to:

 List of birds of Georgia (country)
 List of birds of Georgia (U.S. state)

Disambiguation pages